Machuchal is one of the forty subbarrios of Santurce, San Juan, Puerto Rico.

Demographics
In 2000, Machuchal had a population of 1,212.

In 2010, Machuchal had a population of 1,262 and a population density of 25,240 persons per square mile.

Cityscape
In 2020, residents complained that businesses flourish during the day but crime and vandalism make Machuchal a dangerous and unpleasant place at night.

See also
 
 List of communities in Puerto Rico

References

Santurce, San Juan, Puerto Rico
Municipality of San Juan